The Tenaga National Sports Complex is a cricket grounds in Kuala Lumpur, Malaysia. The ground was renamed as the Tenaga Sports Ground in February 1997 and was formerly known as Kilat Kelab Club (Kilat means 'lightning' in English). 

The Venue has the capacity to hold several thousand people but there is no permanent seating facilities in the ground but tents are positioned around the boundary. The ground has turf wickets. 

The venue hosted the international Super 8's in July 1996. The ground was also used for the final, between Kenya and Bangladesh in the 1997 ICC Trophy.

References

External links
 Ground Profile
 BBC

Sports venues in Kuala Lumpur
Cricket grounds in Malaysia